Sang Jar (also Romanized as Sang Jār) is a village in Panjak-e Rastaq Rural District, Kojur District, Nowshahr County, Mazandaran Province, Iran. At the 2006 census, its population was 33, in 10 families.

References 

Populated places in Nowshahr County